Arginine vasopressin-induced protein 1 is a protein that in humans is encoded by the AVPI1 gene.

References

External links

Further reading